Lishu County is a county of western Jilin province, China, bordering Liaoning to the southwest.

Administrative divisions
Lishu County administers 17 towns and six townships.

Towns:

Townships:
Baishan Township
Shengli Township
Quanyanling Township
Jinshan Township
Shuanghe Township
Sikeshu Township

Climate

References

External links

County-level divisions of Jilin